Lincang Airport  is an airport serving the city of Lincang in Yunnan province, China. The airport started operation on March 25, 2001.  The airport is 22.5 km from the center of the city in the town of Boshang.

Airlines and destinations

See also
Cangyuan Washan Airport
List of airports in China
List of the busiest airports in China

External links

Airports in Yunnan
Airports established in 2001
2001 establishments in China
Transport in Lincang